The White Hart is a former pub at 121 Bishopsgate, London.

The librarian at the Bishopsgate Institute, Charles Goss, wrote a history of the White Hart in 1930, and believed that it dated back to 1246. Samuel Nixon (sculptor) had his workshop at The White Hart (1838-1854).

It certainly existed as The White Hart in 1377. However, it was rebuilt in 1480 and 1829. It closed in 2014, and its facade was integrated into a nine-storey office block.

References

Pubs in the City of London
Former pubs in London